The Eugeneodontida is an extinct and poorly known order of cartilaginous fishes. They possessed "tooth-whorls" on the symphysis of either the lower or both jaws and pectoral fins supported by long radials. They probably lacked pelvic fins and anal fins. The palatoquadrate was either fused to the skull or reduced. Now determined to be within the Holocephali, their closest living relatives are ratfish. The eugeneodonts are named after paleontologist Eugene S. Richardson, Jr. The Eugeneodontida disappeared in the Early Triassic. 

Members of the Eugeneodontida are further classified into different families, the most well-preserved members that have been discovered are commonly placed within the families Helicoprionidae ("spiral saws"), and Edestidae ("those which devour"), the former containing the genera Helicoprion, Sarcoprion, and Parahelicoprion, and the latter containing the genera Edestus, Lestrodus, and Metaxyacanthus. All eugeneodonts are thought to have been obligate carnivores, with each genus having specialized feeding behaviors, territory ranges, and specific prey.

Taxonomy
Superfamily Caseodontoidea
Family Caseodontidae
Genus Caseodus
Genus Erikodus
Genus Fadenia
Genus Ornithoprion
Genus Pirodus
Genus Romerodus
Family Eugeneodontidae
Genus Bobbodus
Genus Eugeneodus
Genus Gilliodus
Family incertae sedis
Genus Campodus
Genus Chiastodus
Genus Tiaraju
Superfamily Edestoidea
Family Helicoprionidae
Genus Agassizodus
Genus Arpagodus
Genus Campyloprion
Genus Helicoprion
Genus Parahelicoprion
Genus Sarcoprion
Genus Toxoprion
Family Edestidae
Genus Edestus
Genus Helicampodus
Genus Lestrodus
Genus Parahelicampodus
Genus Syntomodus
Family incertae sedis
Genus Paredestus

References

External links
 Palaeos Vertebrates 70.100 Chondrichthyes: Eugnathostomata at paleos.com 
JSTOR: Journal of Paleontology Vol. 70, No. 1 (Jan., 1996), pp. 162-165
More about Chondrichthyes at Devonian Times

 
Mississippian first appearances
Mississippian taxonomic orders
Pennsylvanian taxonomic orders
Cisuralian taxonomic orders
Guadalupian taxonomic orders
Lopingian taxonomic orders
Early Triassic taxonomic orders
Early Triassic extinctions
Prehistoric cartilaginous fish orders